The Tip of the Iceberg is a 2016 Spanish thriller film directed by David Cánovas which stars Maribel Verdú, Carmelo Gómez, Bárbara Goenaga, Fernando Cayo, Álex García and Ginés García Millán. It is an adaptation of the stage play of the same name by Antonio Tabares.

Plot 
In the wake of the suicide of three individuals employed by a multinational tech company, a company executive is tasked with elaborating an internal report on the incident. What she finds out vis-à-vis the working environment is disturbing.

Cast

Production 
The Tip of the Iceberg is  debut film. Gerardo Herrero is credited as producer. It was produced by Tornasol Films, Mistery Producciones A.I.E., Hernández y Fernández Producciones Cinematográficas and Perenquen Films AIE, with the participation of TVE, the support from ICAA and funding from ICO.

Release 
The film was presented at the Málaga Film Festival (FMCE) on 23 April 2016. Distributed by Syldavia Cinema, the film was theatrically released in Spain on 29 April 2016.

See also 
 List of Spanish films of 2016

References

External links 
 The Tip of the Iceberg at ICAA's Catálogo de Cinespañol

Spanish thriller films
2016 thriller films
2010s Spanish-language films
Films about labor relations
2010s Spanish films